Richard Davenport may refer to:

 Richard Davenport (professor) (born 1946), speech-language pathology professor and university administrator
 Richard Davenport (sprinter) (born 1985), English sprinter
 Richard Alfred Davenport (1777–1852), English miscellaneous writer
 a fictional character